Zickrick is a township in Jones County, South Dakota, United States.

References

Townships in Jones County, South Dakota
Townships in South Dakota